Haiti competed at the 2022 World Aquatics Championships in Budapest, Hungary from 17 June to 3 July.

Swimming

Haiti entered two swimmers.

Men

References

Nations at the 2022 World Aquatics Championships
Haiti at the World Aquatics Championships
World Aquatics Championships